Internet in India began in 1986 and was available only to the educational and research community. General public access to the internet began on 15 August 1995. American multinational digital communications technology conglomerate Cisco estimated that India will have more than 900 million internet users by 2023.

It is reported that in 2022 an average mobile internet consumption of an Indian was 19.5 GB per month and pan India mobile data usage per month rose from 4.5 exabytes in 2018 to 14.4 exabytes in 2022.

Indian PM Narendra Modi at BRICS Business Forum 2022 has stated that India will become 1 trillion dollars digital economy by 2025 having a potential of reaching 2.5 trillion dollars.

As of May 2014, the Internet is delivered to India mainly by 9 different undersea fibres, including SEA-ME-WE 3, Bay of Bengal Gateway and Europe India Gateway, arriving at 5 different landing points. In 2022 its reported that India is also a potential market of Starlink and apart from having one overland internet connection, at the city of Agartala near the border with Bangladesh, India has also established 2,300-km undersea cable to increase internet connectivity to its Andaman and Nicobar archipelago in 2020.

The Indian Government has embarked on projects such as BharatNet, Digital India, Brand India and Startup India to further expedite the growth of internet-based ecosystems.

Reliance has started the project of underlying submarine cable connecting continents of Europe and Asia and keeping India its centre India-Europe-Xpress (IEX) and India-Asia-Xpress (IAX) - the world's largest submarine cable system - are said to be ready between 2023 and 2024.

History 
While early computer networks were operated since the late 1970s by the Oil and Natural Gas Corporation, the military, along with general-use computer networks such as INDONET, NICNET, and VIKRAM, the history of the Internet in India began with the launch of the Educational Research Network (ERNET) in 1986. The network was made available only to educational and research communities. ERNET was initiated by the Department of Electronics (DoE), with funding from the Government of India and United Nations Development Program (UNDP), involving eight premier institutions as participating agencies—NCST Bombay, Indian Institute of Science, five Indian Institutes of Technology (Delhi, Mumbai, Kanpur, Kharagpur and Chennai), and the DoE in New Delhi. ERNET began as a multi protocol network with both the TCP/IP and the OSI-IP protocol stacks running over the leased-line portion of the backbone. Since 1995, however, almost all traffic is carried over TCP/IP. The first leased line of 9.6 kbit/s was installed in January 1991 between Delhi and Mumbai. ERNET was allotted Class B IP address 144.16.0.0 by NIC (then InterNIC) in 1990. Subsequently, Class C addresses were allotted to ERNET by APNIC. All IITs, IISc Bangalore, DOE Delhi and NCST Mumbai were connected by 9.6 kbit/s leased line by 1992. In the same year, 64 kbit/s Internet gateway link was commissioned from NCST Mumbai to UUNet in Virginia, United States. NICNet was established in 1995 for communications between government institutions. The network was operated by the National Informatics Centre.

The first publicly available internet service in India was launched by state-owned Videsh Sanchar Nigam Limited (VSNL) on 15 August 1995. At the time, VSNL had a monopoly over international communications in the country and private enterprise was not permitted in the sector. The internet service, known as the Gateway Internet Access Service (GIAS), provided a speed of 9.6 kbit/s speed and was priced at ₹5,200 for 250 hours for individuals, ₹16,200 for institutional dial-up SLIP/PPP accounts, and higher for leased line services.

However, for the next 10 years the Internet experience in the country remained less attractive with narrow-band connections having speeds less than 56 kbit/s (dial-up).

Integrated Services Digital Network (ISDN) access was introduced in 1997.

In 2004, the government formulated its broadband policy which defined broadband as "an always-on Internet connection with download speed of 256 kbit/s or above." From 2005 onward, the growth of the broadband sector in the country accelerated, but remained below the growth estimates of the government and related agencies due to resource issues in last-mile access which were predominantly wired-line technologies. This bottleneck was removed in 2010 when the government auctioned 3G spectrum followed by an equally high-profile auction of 4G spectrum that set the scene for a competitive and invigorated wireless broadband market. Today, internet access in India is provided by both public and private companies using a variety of technologies and media including dial-up (PSTN), xDSL, coaxial cable, Ethernet, FTTH, ISDN, HSDPA (3G), WiFi, WiMAX, etc. at a wide range of speeds and costs.

Technologies

Wireless Internet
The following frequencies are used to provide wireless internet services in India:
 2G : GSM 900 MHz, GSM 1800 MHz
 3G : WCDMA UMTS 2100 MHz, 900 MHz
 4G : TD-LTE 2300 MHz, 2500 MHz, FD-LTE 2100 MHz, 1800 MHz, 900 MHz, 850 MHz
 CDMA : 800 MHz (for 1x voice and data & EVDO Rev A, Rev B, Rev B Phase II data)

Wired internet
Fixed-line or wired internet technologies used in India include digital subscriber line, (DSL), Dial-up Internet access, ethernet and local area network (LAN), Cable modem, fibre to the home, and leased line.

Internet speed 
 In 2004, the government formulated its broadband policy which defined broadband as "an always-on Internet connection with download speed of 256 kbit/s or above." The definition was amended in July 2013 defining broadband as a "data connection that supports interactive services, including internet access, capable of a minimum download speed of 256 kbps to an individual subscriber." The minimum download speed was officially raised from 256 kbit/s to 512 kbit/s in August 2014.

On 1 September 2021, TRAI raised the minimum broadband speed to 2 Mbit/s. The regulator announced that broadband would now be defined as "an always-on data connection, provided over fixed or wireless infrastructure, that is able to support multiple information and interactive services such as Internet access and on demand video, and offers a minimum downlink and uplink speed of 2 Mbps to an individual subscriber from the point of presence (POP) of the service provider intending to provide the Broadband service".

The worldwide broadband speed league 2021 ranked India 80th out of 224 countries with a mean download speed of 22.53 Mbit/s. According to the Akamai Q1 2017 State of the Internet Report, the average internet connection speed in India is 6.5 Mbit/s and the average peak connection speed is 41.4 Mbit/s. Globally, India was ranked 89th out of 149 countries/regions by average internet connection speed and 97th by average peak connection speed. 42% of internet users in India have an average internet connection speed of above 4 Mbit/s, 19% have a speed of over 10 Mbit/s, and 10% enjoy speeds over 15 Mbit/s. The average internet connection speed on mobile networks in India was 4.9 Mbit/s.

According to the February 2022 Speedtest Global Index, published by Speedtest.net, India was ranked 70th out of 180 countries by median fixed broadband speed and 115th out of 138 countries by median mobile internet speed. The median fixed broadband download speed in India is 48.14 Mbit/s and the median fixed broadband upload speed is 46.20 Mbit/s. Speedtest recorded the median download speed on mobile connections in India as 14.18 Mbit/s and median upload speed of 3.67 Mbit/s.

Internet user base 
India has the second highest number of internet users in the world. The following table provides an overview of internet subscriber statistics in India as on 30 June 2021.

The World Economic Forum (WEF) estimated that about 60% of Indian internet users viewed vernacular content and only about a quarter of internet users were over the age of 35 years in 2019. The WEF also estimated that 1.1 billion Indians would have access to the internet by 2030, with 80% of the subscriber base primarily accessing the internet on mobile devices. The profile of India's internet user base was predicted to diversify by 2030 with 80% of users accessing vernacular content and with users over 25 years making up 45% of the total subscriber base. There is also a digital gender gap with far more male internet users in the country compared to female users. The gap is more pronounced in rural hinterlands compared to urban metros.

Access to the Internet can be divided into dial-up and broadband access. Around the start of the 21st century, most residential access was by dial-up, while access from businesses was usually by higher speed connections. In subsequent years dial-up declined in favour of broadband access. Both types of access generally use a modem, which converts digital data to analog for transmission over a particular analog network (ex. the telephone or cable networks).

Dial-up access is a connection to the Internet through a phone line, creating a semi-permanent link to the Internet. Operating on a single channel, it monopolizes the phone line and is the slowest method of accessing the Internet. Dial-up is often the only form of Internet access available in rural areas because it requires no infrastructure other than the already existing telephone network. Dial-up connections typically do not exceed a speed of 56 kbit/s, because they are primarily made via a 56k modem.

Broadband access includes a wide range of speeds and technologies, all of which provide much faster access to the Internet than dial-up. The term "broadband" once had a technical meaning, but today it is more often a marketing buzzword that simply means "faster". Broadband connections are continuous or "always on" connections, without the need to dial and hang-up, and do not monopolize phone lines. Common types of broadband access include DSL (Digital Subscriber Lines), Fibre to the x (Optical fibre network), Cable Internet access, Satellite Internet access, mobile broadband via cell phones and other mobile devices among many others.

Internet service providers

There were 358 Internet Service Providers (ISPs) offering broadband and narrowband services in India as on 31 December 2019. The ten largest ISPs account for 99.50% of the total subscriber base. Jio (51.60%), Airtel (23.24%), Vodafone Idea (19.77%), BSNL (4.21%) and Atria Convergence Technologies (0.21%) were the five largest ISPs by subscribers in India as on 31 December 2019.

As on 31 December 2019, the five largest wired broadband providers in India are BSNL (51.75%), Airtel (10.80%), Atria Convergence Technologies (6.78%), Hathway (4.01%) and Jio (3.83%). Other wired ISPs account for the remaining 22.82% of subscribers. The five largest wireless broadband providers are Jio (53.14%), Airtel (23.64%), Vodafone Idea (20.40%) and BSNL (2.68%).

The telecom circles of Maharashtra (40.21 million), Andhra Pradesh & Telangana (38.28 million), Tamil Nadu (35.90 million) Gujarat (32.16 million) and Karnataka (31.74 million) have the most broadband subscribers as on 31 September 2018.

The total International Internet bandwidth owned by Indian ISPs was 2,933 Gbit/s as on 30 June 2017. International Bandwidth is the maximum rate of data transmission from a single country to the rest of the world.

Net neutrality

, there were no laws governing net neutrality in India, which would require that all Internet users be treated equally, without discriminating or charging differentially by user, content, site, platform, application, type of attached equipment, or mode of communication. There have already been a few violations of net neutrality principles by some Indian service providers. The government has once again called in for comments and suggestions regarding net neutrality as of 14 August, and has given the people one day to post their views on the MyGov forum. After this, the final decision regarding the debate was to be made.

The debate on network neutrality in India gathered public attention after Airtel, a mobile telephony service provider in India, announced in December 2014 additional charges for making voice calls (VoIP) from its network using apps like WhatsApp, Skype, etc.

In March 2015, Telecom Regulatory Authority of India (TRAI) released a formal consultation paper on Regulatory Framework for Over-the-top (OTT) services, seeking comments from the public. The consultation paper was criticised for being one sided and having confusing statements. It received condemnation from various politicians and Indian Internet users. The last date for submission of comment was 24 April 2015 and TRAI received over a million emails.

On 8 February 2016, TRAI took a revolutionary decision, prohibiting telecom service providers from levying discriminatory rates for data, thus ruling in favor of Net Neutrality in India. This move was welcomed not just by millions of Indians but also by various political parties, businesspersons, industry leaders, and the inventor of the World Wide Web, Tim Berners Lee.

Censorship

Internet censorship in India is selectively practiced by both federal and state governments. DNS filtering and educating service users in better usage is an active strategy and government policy to regulate and block access to Internet content on a large scale. Measures to remove content at the request of content creators through court orders have become more common in recent years.

Freedom House's Freedom on the Net 2016 report gives India a Freedom on the Net status of "Partly Free" with a rating of 41 (0-100 scale, lower is better). Its Obstacles to Access was rated 12 (0-25 scale), Limits on Content was rated 9 (0-35 scale) and Violations of User Rights was rated 20 (0-40 scale). India was ranked 29th out of the 65 countries included in the report.

Challenges 
One of the major issues facing the Internet segment in India is the lower average bandwidth of broadband connections compared to that of developed countries. According to 2007 statistics, the average download speed in India hovered at about 40 KB per second (256 kbit/s), the minimum speed set by TRAI, whereas the international average was 5.6 Mbit/s during the same period. In order to attend this infrastructure issue the government declared 2007 as "the year of broadband". To compete with international standards of defining broadband speed the Indian Government has taken the aggressive step of proposing a ₹690 billion national broadband network to connect all cities, towns and villages with a population of more than 500 in two phases targeted for completion by 2012 and 2013. Google and Tata have launched the Internet Saathi project to help increase digital literacy amongst women in rural areas. The network was supposed to provide speeds up to 10 Mbit/s in 63 metropolitan areas and 4 Mbit/s in an additional 352 cities. Also, the Internet penetration rate in India is medium and accounts for 42% of the population compared to the rate in OECD counties, where the average is over 50%. Another issue is the digital divide where growth is biased in favour of urban areas; according to 2010 statistics, more than 75 per cent of the broadband connections in the country are in the top 30 cities. Regulators have tried to boost the growth of broadband in rural areas by promoting higher investment in rural infrastructure and establishing subsidised tariffs for rural subscribers under the Universal service obligation scheme of the Indian government.

E-commerce industry
No. of Indian consumers who purchased something online in 2018: 120 million

No. of Indian consumers who are expected to purchase something online in 2020: 175 million

Indian e-commerce Industry in 2017: ₹2.46 Trillion

Data centres 
 BSNL Internet Data Centers, in collaboration with Dimension Data
 Trimax IT Infrastructure & Services Limited – Tier III data centers in Mumbai and Bengaluru
 Airlive Broadband
 Web Werks Data Centers
 Sify Technologies Limited
 CtrlS Datacenters Ltd
 Tata Communications Limited
 Netmagic Solutions
 Reliance Datacenter
 Web Werks IDC
 Net4 Datacenter
 RackBank Datacenter
 GPX Global Systems Inc.
 CTRLS Data Center
 MegaHostZone
 Digital Ocean
 DeleteZero
 HostRain
 Amazon Web Services
Google Cloud

Internet Exchanges
NIXI
Mumbai Convergence Hub
Mumbai IX
AMS IX
DE-CIX
AMR-IX

See also
Internet Freedom Foundation
National Optical Fibre Network
List of countries by number of Internet users
List of countries by number of broadband Internet subscriptions
List of countries by Internet connection speeds

References